This article lists political parties in Burkina Faso.

Active parties

Parliamentary parties

Contested 2020 election
 Alternative Faso (Le Faso Autrement, FA)
 Movement for Democracy in Africa
 National Rebirth Party (Parti de la Renaissance Nationale, PAREN)
 New Alliance of Faso (Nouvelle Alliance du Faso, NAFA)
 Patriotic Front for Change (Front Patriotique pour le Changement, FPC)
 Union for the Republic (Union pour la République, UPR)

Other parties

 Alliance for Democracy and Progress / Party of National Reconciliation (Alliance pour la Démocratie et le Progrès / Parti de Réconciliation Nationale, ADP/PRN)
 Alliance for Progress and Freedom (Alliance pour le Progrès et la Liberté. APL)
 Alliance for Rebirth, Democracy and Integration (Alliance pour la Renaissance, la Démocratie et l’Intégration, ARDI)
 Alliance for the Defense of Democracy and Progress (Alliance pour la Défense de la Démocratie et le Progrès, ADDP)
 Alliance of Progressive Forces (Alliance des Forces Progressistes, AFP)
 Burkinabè Liberal Party (Parti Libéral Burkinabè, PLB)
 Burkinabé Party for Refoundation (Parti Burkinabè pour la Refondation, PBR)
 Citizens’ League of Builders (Ligue Citoyenne des Batisseurs, LCB)
 Convention for Democracy and Federation (Convention pour la Démocratie et la Fédération, CDF)
 Convention for Democracy and Freedom (Convention pour la Démocratie et la Liberté, CDL)
 Convergence for Social Democracy (Convergence pour la Démocratie Sociale, CDS)
 Convergence of Hope (Convergence de l'Espoir)
 Democratic and Popular Rally (Rassemblement Démocratique et Populaire, RDP)
 Democratic Awakening of the Masses (Réveil Démocratique des Masses, RDM)
 Democratic Organization for the Defense of Nature (Organisation Démocratique pour la Défense de la Nature, ODDN)
 Democratic Union of Faso (Union Démocratique du Faso, UDF)
 Ecologist Party for the Development of Burkina (Parti Ecologiste pour le Développement du Burkina, PEDB)
 Front for Integration and Social Development (Front pour l’Intégration et le Développement Social, F/IDS)
 Group of Patriotic Democrats (Groupe des Démocrates Patriotes, GDP)
 Group of Republican Democrats (Groupe des Démocrates Républicain, GDR)
 Liberal Party of Burkina (Parti Libéral du Burkina, PLB)
 Movement for Democracy and Rebirth (Mouvement pour la Démocratie et la Renaissance, MDR)
 Movement for Tolerance and Progress (Mouvement pour la Tolérance et le Progrès, MTP)
 Movement of the Union of the Democratic Peasants for Progress (Mouvement de l’Union des Paysans Démocrates pour le Progrès, MUPDP)
 National Convention for Renewal / New Era (Convention Nationale pour le Renouveau / Ère Nouvelle, CNR/EN)
 National Convention of Progressive Democrats (Convention Nationale des Démocrates Progressistes, CNDP)
 National Council for Democracy, re. 2015 Burkinabe coup d'état
 National Democratic Party (Burkina Faso) (Parti Démocratique National, PDN)
 National League for Democracy, the Coalized Movements for Democratic Alternance in Burkina Faso (Ligue Nationale pour la Démocratie, les Mouvements Coalisés pour l’Alternance Démocratique au Burkina Faso, LINAD/MOCLAD/BF)
 National Patriots' Party (Parti National des Patriotes, PNP)
 National Salvation Front (Front National du Salut, FNS)
 National Union for Democracy and Development (Union Nationale pour la Démocratie et le Développement, UNDD)
 National Union for Democracy and Progress (Union Nationale pour la Démocratie et le Progrès, UNDP)
 National Union for Independence and Solidarity (Union Nationale pour l’Indépendance et la Solidarité, UNIS)
 New Alliance Party (Parti de la Nouvelle Alliance, PNA)
 New Political Rally (Rassemblement Politique Nouveau, RPN)
 New Social Democracy (Nouvelle Démocratie Sociale, NDS)
 Organisation for Democracy and Labour (Organisation pour la Démocratie et le Travail, ODT)
 Pan-African Movement of Faso (Mouvement Panafricain du Faso, MPF)
 Party for Concord and Progress (Parti pour la Concorde et le Progrès, PCP)
 Party for Democracy and Progress / Socialist Party (Parti pour la Démocratie et le Progrès / Parti Socialiste, PDP/PS)
 Party for Progress and Social Development (Parti pour le Progrès et le Développement Social, PPDS)
 Party of Independence, Labour and Justice (Parti de l’indépendance, du travail et de la justice, PITJ)
 Party of Progress and for National Renewal (Parti du Progrès pour le Renouveau National, PPRN)
 Party of the Independent Forces for Development (Parti des Forces Indépendantes pour le Développement, PFID)
 Patriotic Movement for Renewal (Mouvement Patriotique pour le Renouveau, MPR)
 Patriotic Movement of the Popular Front and the African Integration (Mouvement Patriotique du Front Populaire et de l’Intégration Africaine, MPFP/IA)
 Patriotic Movement of Young Democrats (Mouvement Patriotique des Jeunes Démocrates, MPJD)
 Patriotic Rally of Faso (Rassemblement Patriotique du Faso, RPF)
 People’s Council for Action (Conseil du Peuple pour l’Action, COPAC)
 People's Movement for Socialism / Federal Party (Mouvement du Peuple pour le Socialisme / Parti Fédéral, MPS/PF)
 Pesants’ and Workers’ Alliance of Burkina (Alliance des Paysans et Ouvriers du Burkina, APOB)
 Progress Party for National Renewal (Parti du Progrès pour le Renouveau National, PPRN)
 Rally for Popular Prosperity (Rassemblement pour la Prospérité Populaire/GWASIFI, RPP/GWASIGI)
 Rally of Democrats for the Faso (Rassemblement des Démocrates pour le Faso, RDF)
 Rally of Independent Forces / Youth Party of Burkina (Rassemblement des Forces Indépendantes / Parti des Jeunes du Burkina, RFI/PJD)
 Rally of Republicans (Rassemblement des Républicains, RDR)
 Rally of the Ecologists of Burkina (Rassemblement des Écologistes du Burkina, RDEB)
 Refusal Front (Front de Refus)
 Republican Democratic Front (Front Démocratique Républicain, FDR)
 Republican National Party / Just Way (Parti National Républicain / Juste Voie, PNR/JV)
 Republican Party for Integration (Parti Républicain pour l'Intégration, PARI)
 Sankarist Democratic Front (Front Démocratique Sankariste, FDS)
 Social Forces Front (Front des Forces Sociales, FFS)
 Social Union of Burkina (Union Sociale du Burkina, USB)
 Socialist Peasants Party (Parti Socialiste Paysan, PSP)
 Greens of Burkina (Les Verts du Burkina)
 Unified Socialist Party (Parti Socialiste Unifié, PSU)
 Union for Democracy and Development (Union pour la Démocratie et le Développement, UDD)
 Union of Democratic and Progressive Forces (Uion des Forces Démocratiques et Progressistes, UFDP)
 Union of Democratic Forces (Union des Forces Démocratiques, UFD)
 Union of Democratic Peasants / Labour Party (Union des Paysans Démocrates / Parti du Travail, UPD/PT)
 Union of Independent Democrats and Progressives (Union des Démocrates et Progressistes Indépendants, UDPI)
 Union of Independent Democrats (Union des Démocrates Indépendants, UDI)
 Union of Liberals for Democracy (Union des Libéraux pour la Démocratie)
 Union of Patriots for Development (Union des Patriotes pour le Développement, UPD)
 Union of Progressive Forces (Union des Forces Progressistes, UFP)
 Union of Republicans (Union des Républicains, UDR)
 Union of the Renewal Forces (Union des Forces pour le Renouveau, UFR)
 Voltaic Revolutionary Communist Party (Parti Communiste Révolutionnaire Voltaïque, PCRV)

Other alliances
 African Convention for Democracy (Convention Africaine pour la Démocratie, CAD)
 Collective of Democratic Mass Organizations and Political Parties (Collectif des Organisations Démocratiques de Masse et de Partis Politiques, CODMPP)
 Convention of Democratic Forces (Convention des Forces Démocratiques, CFD)
 Coordination of Extra-parliamentary Parties (Coordination des Partis Extra Parlementaires, COPEP)
 February 14th Group (Groupe du 14 Février, G14)
 United Burkinabè Opposition (Opposition Burkinabè Unie, OBU)

Historical parties

 African Independence Party (Parti Africain de l’Indépendance, PAI)
 African Independence Party (Touré) (Parti African de l’Indépendance, PAI (Touré))
 African Popular Movement (Mouvement Populaire Africain, MPA)
 Alliance for Democracy and Social Emancipation (Alliance pour la Démocratie et l'Émancipation Sociale, ADES)
 Alliance for Youth and Social Integration (Alliance pour la Jeunesse et l’Intégration Sociale, AJIS)
 Alliance of Republicans for Burkina Faso (Alliance des Républicains du Burkina Faso, ARBF)
 Burkinabé Bolshevik Party (Parti Bolchévique Burkinabè, PBB)
 Burkinabè Communist Group (Groupe Communiste Burkinabè, GCB)
 Burkinabè Revolutionary Progressive Party (Parti Progressiste Révolutionnaire Burkinabé, PPRB)
 Burkinabè Socialist Bloc (Bloc Socialiste Burkinabè, BSB)
 Burkinabè Socialist Party (Parti Socialiste Burkinabè, PSB)
 Conscience for a Democratic Alternative (Conscience pour une Alternative Démocratique, CAD)
 Current of Democrats Faithful to the Ideal of Thomas Sankara (Courant des Démocrates Fidèles à l'Idéal de Thomas Sankara)
 Democratic Action Group (Groupe de l'Action Démocratique, GAD)
 Democratic Front for Social Wellbeing (Front Démocratique pour le Bien Etre Social, FDBS)
 Democratic Union of Burkina (Union Démocratique du Burkina, UDB)
 Group of Democrats for the Rally of Progressive Forces (Groupe des Démocrates pour le Rassemblement des Forces Progressistes, GDRFP)
 Ecological Party for Progress (Parti Écologiste pour le Progrès, PEP)
 Ecological Party for the Development of Burkina (Parti Écologiste pour le Développement du Burkina, PEDB)
 For the Party (Pour le Parti)
 Group for the Unity of Marxist-Leninists (Groupe pour l'Unité des Marxistes-Léninistes, GUML)
 Group of Revolutionary Democrats (Groupe des Démocrates Révolutionnaires, GDR)
 Labour Party of Burkina (Parti du Travail du Burkina, PTB)
 League for African Integration (Ligue pour l’Intégration Africaine, LIA)
 League for Progress and Development (Ligue pour le Progrès et le Développement, LPD)
 Marxist-Leninist Group (Groupe Marxiste-Léniniste)
 Movement for Socialist Democracy (Mouvement pour la Démocratie Socialiste, MDS)
 Movement of Progressive Democrats (Mouvement des Démocrates Progressistes, MDP)
 National Convention of Progressive Patriots / Social Democratic Party (Convention Nationale des Patriotes Progressistes / Parti Social-Démocrate, CNPP/PSD)
 National Liberation Movement (Mouvement de Libération Nationale, MLN)
 National Union for the Defense of Democracy (Union Nationale pour la Défense de la Démocratie, UNDD)
 Organization for Popular Democracy - Labour Movement (Organisation pour la Démocratie Populaire - Mouvement du Travail, ODP-MT)
 Party Burkinabè Democratique (Parti Démocratique Burkinabé, PDB)
 Party for Democracy and Progress (Parti pour la Démocratie et le Progrès, PDP)
 Party for Democracy and Rally (Parti pour la Démocratie et le Rassemblement, PDR)
 Party for Democracy and Socialism (Parti pour la Démocratie et le Socialisme, PDS)
 Party for Progress, Freedom and Development (Parti pour le Progrès la Liberté et le Développement, PPLD)
 Party for the Defense of Democracy (Parti pour la Défense de la Démocratie, PDP)
 Party of Action for the Liberalism in Solidarity (Parti de l’Action pour le Libéralisme Solidaire, PACT/LS)
 Party of Independents (Parti des Indépendents)
 Party of Social Democracy (Parti de la Démocratie Sociale, PDS)
 Party of Social Progress (Parti du Progrès Social, PPS)
 Patriotic League for Development (Ligue patriotique pour le développement, LIPAD)
 Patriotic Movement for Freedom and Development (Mouvement Patriotique pour la Liberté et le Développement, MPLD)
 People's Unity Party (Parti de l’Unité Populaire, PUP)
 Popular Action Grouping (Groupement d'Action Populaire)
 Popular and Democratic Rally Thomas Sankara (Rassemblement Démocratique et Populaire Thomas Sankara, RDP)
 Posadist Fourth International Group (Groupe Quatrième Internationale Posadiste)
 Rally for the Development of Burkina (Rassemblement pour le Développement du Burkina, RDB)
 Rally of Independent Social Democrats (Rassemblement des Socio-démocrates Indépendants, RSI)
 Regroupment of Communist Officers (Regroupement des Officiers Communistes, ROC)
 Republican Party for Liberty (Parti Républicain pour la Liberté, PRL)
 Republican Party of Burkina (Parti Républicain du Burkina, PRB)
 Revolutionary and Democratic Alliance (Alliance Démocratique et Révolutionnaire, ADR)
 Revolutionary Military Organization (Organisation Militaire Révolutionnaire, OMR)
 Revolutionary Party of Young Democrats of Burkina (Parti Révolutionnaire des Jeunes Démocrates du Burkina, PRJDB)
 Revolutionary Socialist Party (Parti Révolutionnaire Socialiste, PRS)
 Revolutionary Workers Party of Burkina (Parti Révolutionnaire des Travaillistes du Burkina, PRTB)
 Revolutionary Workers' Party (Parti Ouvrier Révolutionnaire, POR)
 Sankarist Movement (Mouvement Sankariste)
 Sankarist Pan-African Convention (Convention Panafricaine Sankariste, CPS)
 Social Party for the Emancipation of the African Masses (Parti Social pour l'Émancipation des Masses Africaines)
 Union for Democracy and Social Progress (Union pour la Démocratie et le Progrès Social, UDPS)
 Union of Burkinabè Communists (Union des Communistes Burkinabè)
 Union of Communist Struggles (Union de Luttes Communistes)
 Union of Communist Struggles - Reconstructed (Union de Luttes Communistes - Reconstruite)
 Union of Communist Struggles - The Flame (Union de Luttes Communistes - La Flamme)
 Union of Democrats and Patriots of Burkina (Union des Démocrates et Patriotes du Burkina, UDPB)
 Union of Greens for the Development of Burkina Faso (Union des verts pour le Développement du Burkina; UVDB)
 Union of Social Democrats (Union des Sociaux-Démocrates, UDS)
 Union of the Democratic Left (Union de la gauche démocratique, UGD)
 Union of the Progressive Forces of Burkina (Union des Forces Progressistes du Burkina, UFPB)
 United Party of Social Democracy (Parti de la Démocratie Sociale Unifié, PDSU)
 Voltaic Communist Organization (Organisation Communiste Voltaique, OCV)
 Voltaic Democratic Movement (Parti Social pour l'Émancipation des Masses Africaines)
 Voltaic Democratic Union (Mouvement Démocratique Voltaïque)
 Voltaic Labour Party (Parti Travailliste Voltaïque)
 Voltaic Progressive Front (Front Progressiste Voltaïque, FPV)
 Voltaic Progressive Union (Union Progressiste Voltaïque, UPV)
 Voltaic Regroupment Movement (Mouvement de Regroupement Voltaïque)
 Voltaic Union (Union Voltaïque)

Historical alliances
 Change 2005 (Alternance 2005)
 Coalition of Democratic Forces (Coalition des Forces Démocratiques, CFD)
 Dialogue of the Burkinabè Opposition (Concertation de l'Opposition Burkinabé, COB)
 Convention of Progress Forces (Convention des Forces du Progrès, CFP)
 Democratic Forces for Progress (Forces Démocratiques pour le Progrès, FDP)
 Popular Front (Front Populaire)
 Republican Front (Front républicain)
 Revolutionary National Council (Conseil National Révolutionnaire, CNR)
 Sankarist Front (Front Sankariste)
 Unified Democratic Party (Parti Démocratique Unifié, PDU)
 United Forces (Forces Unies, FU)
 Union of Sankarist Forces (Union des Forces Sankaristes, UFS)
 Voltaic Solidarity (Solidarité Voltaïque, SV'')

See also
Lists of political parties

 
Political parties
Burkina Faso
Burkina Faso
Pol